The 2008 ITU Triathlon World Cup was a series of triathlon races organised by the International Triathlon Union (ITU) for elite-level triathletes. There were twelve races held in twelve countries, each held over a distance of 1500 m swim, 40 km cycle, 10 km run (an Olympic-distance triathlon). Alongside a prize purse, points were awarded at each race contributing towards the overall World Cup for which an additional prize purse was awarded. The 2008 World Cup was sponsored by BG Group. The 2008 World Cup series marked the final year of this race and championship format as the ITU shifted its focus to developing the World Championship Series.

Venues, dates and prize purses

Event results

Mooloolaba

New Plymouth

Ishigaki

Tongyeong

Richards Bay

Madrid

Des Moines

Hamburg

Tiszaújváros

Kitzbühel

Lorient

Huatulco

Overall rankings
At each race of the series points were awarded to the top 20 finishers per the table below. In addition to the points awarded for the twelve World Cup legs, double points were awarded for results achieved in the ITU Triathlon World Championship race in Vancouver, British Columbia, Canada on 7–8 June 2008.

Men

Women

Medal table

Note: Rank is arranged by total number of medals.

References

2008
World Cup